Md. Mamunoor Rashid is a Jatiya Party politician and the former Member of Parliament from Jamalpur-4.

Early life
Rashid was born on 31 December 1968. He has an Alim degree.

Career
Rashid was elected to Parliament from Jamalpur-4 as a Jatiya Party candidate on 5 January 2014.

References

Jatiya Party politicians
Living people
1968 births
10th Jatiya Sangsad members